Tessa Margaret Niles (née Webb; born 27 January 1961 in Ilford, Essex) is an English singer, best known as a backing singer for a wide variety of contemporary artists. She began her professional singing career in 1979.

Early life and career
Niles began her professional singing career, as both a lead and a backing vocalist, in 1979. Throughout her career, Niles has worked with many artists including ABC, Eric Clapton, Kiri Te Kanawa, The Rolling Stones, Annie Lennox, Tears For Fears, Duran Duran, Kylie Minogue, David Bowie, The Police, Take That, Grace Jones, Tina Turner, Paul McCartney, George Harrison, Steve Winwood, Morrissey–Mullen, Snowy White, Tom Jones, Marillion, Fish, Pet Shop Boys, Buddy Guy, B*Witched, Victoria Beckham, Nick Carter, Living in a Box, Cliff Richard, Mike + The Mechanics, Zucchero, Status Quo, Robbie Williams, Bill Sharpe, Gary Numan, Wham!, Andrew Ridgeley, Dusty Springfield, The The, Jimmy Nail, Cher, Cabaret Voltaire, Seal, Liza Minnelli, John Denver and The Escape Club.

In the mid-1980s, Niles was featured the lead vocalist (along with Clive Griffin) for the jazz ensemble Bandzilla, which was led by her then-husband Richard Niles. The band toured and were featured as the resident house band on the Channel 4 television show Don't Miss Wax in 1987. In 1991, the band released their debut album, Blue Movies, again featuring Niles as lead vocalist.

Niles has also voiced and sung on various television commercials for products including Barbie, Levi's, Cadillac, Diet Pepsi, Delta Air Lines, Aquafresh, KFC and DHL.

Her association with Eric Clapton began with his 1986 album August. She toured with him from 1988 to 1992, again in October 1997, and again on his 1999 tour of Japan. She sang backing vocals during the George Harrison/Eric Clapton tour of Japan in 1991 and for Clapton's Unplugged concert in 1992. Niles also appeared at Clapton's Crossroads Benefit Concert on 30 June 1999 and the Concert for George on 29 November 2002.

Niles performed vocals during one version of the song "All I Want For Christmas Is You" for the 2003 film Love Actually.

Niles also performed at Live Aid at Wembley in 1985, where she provided backing vocals for David Bowie (who introduced her as "Theresa" in the prelude to "Heroes"). On 16 & 17 June 1989 she performed vocals at Cliff Richard´s gigs: From a Distance: The Event recorded at Wembley Stadium. In 1992 she featured in the Cliff Richard´s studio album  The album.

Personal life
She is the former wife of American musician Richard Niles, whom she married in 1982. Later she married Eduardo Chivambo Mondlane Jr., the son of Eduardo Mondlane. In 1998 Niles gave birth to twins, Mikaela and Fallon Mondlane.

Career highlights

References

External links

Tessa Niles' official website
Tessa Niles' at LinkedIn
Tessa Niles' official Facebook page

English women singers
Living people
People from Ilford
Musicians from Kent
1961 births
English session musicians
Robbie Williams Band members
Morrissey–Mullen members